J Street is a nonprofit liberal advocacy group based in the United States.

J Street or "J" Street also refers to the tenth of a sequence of alphabetical streets in many cities (if "I" or "J" is not omitted).
 
J Street may also refer to:

 J Street U, J Street's college and university campus organizing arm
 J Street (Washington, D.C.), the (non-existent) street in Washington, D.C.

See also
 J. A. Street (1822–1889), British Army officer in Ceylon